This article shows the rosters of all participating teams at the 2015 Montreux Volley Masters in Switzerland.

Pool A

The following is the Dutch roster in the 2015 Montreux Volley Masters.

Head coach: Giovanni Guidetti

The following is the Russian roster in the 2015 Montreux Volley Masters.

Head coach: Vadim Pankov

The following is the Chinese roster in the 2015 Montreux Volley Masters.

Head coach: Xu Jiande

The following is the Dominican roster in the 2015 Montreux Volley Masters.

Head coach:  Marcos Kwiek

Pool B

The following is the Japanese roster in the 2015 Montreux Volley Masters.

Head coach: Masayoshi Manabe

The following is the Turkish roster in the 2015 Montreux Volley Masters.

Head coach: Ferhat Akbas

The following is the German roster in the 2015 Montreux Volley Masters.

Head coach:  Luciano Pedullà

The following is the Italian roster in the 2015 Montreux Volley Masters.

Head coach: Marco Bonitta

References

External links
Official website

2015
Montreux Volley Masters squads
Montreux Volley Masters squads